Bete or La Bête may refer to:


People and languages
 Bété people of Côte d'Ivoire
 Bété languages
 Bété syllabary
 Bete people (Nigeria)
 Bete language (Nigeria), a language of Bete Town, Nigeria
 Bete (priest), the traditional priestly class in Fiji
 Bete Mendes (born 1949), Brazilian actress and politician

Arts and entertainment
 Bete (film), a 1986 Kannada film by V. Somasekhar
 La Bête, a 1991 play by David Hirson
 La Bête (film), a 1975 French erotic fantasy horror film
 Bête, a historical French card game
 Bête (cards), a penalty in certain card games

Other uses
 Beryllium telluride (BeTe)

See also
 Bette (disambiguation)

Language and nationality disambiguation pages